Bent Fabricius-Bjerre (7 December 1924 – 28 July 2020), better known internationally as Bent Fabric, was a Danish pianist and composer.

Biography
Bent Fabricius-Bjerre was born in Frederiksberg, Denmark. He started a jazz ensemble after World War II and founded a label, Metronome Records, in 1950. However, he is best known for his 1961 instrumental "Omkring et flygel" (literally, "Around a Grand Piano") which became a hit in Denmark. The song was re-released worldwide under the name "Alley Cat" on Atco Records the following year, and went to #1 in Australia and #49 in Germany. The tune also became a hit in the United States; the song hit #2 on the AC chart and #7 on the Billboard Hot 100, and the LP of the same name hit #13 on the Billboard 200. "Alley Cat" also won a Grammy Award for Best Rock & Roll Recording. It sold over one million copies, and was awarded a gold disc. The follow-up single, "Chicken Feed", hit #63 in the U.S.

Fabricius-Bjerre had done extensive work in film scores prior to the success of his singles, and continued to work in film for decades after. In 2003, Fabricius-Bjerre returned to the charts, this time in his native Denmark. He released the album Jukebox as Bent Fabric, where he worked with critically acclaimed Danish musicians, including Peter Frödin. The singles "Jukebox" hit #3 in Denmark and "Shake" hit #10 that year. In 2006, a remix of "Jukebox" was released, and the title track became a dance music hit, peaking at #7 on the US Dance/Club Play charts. The album was also re-released in the United States, this time featuring a remix of his famous instrumental song "Alley Cat", formerly known as “Omkring et flygel” (“Around a Piano”), among others.

In 2005 he released the compilation album, Kan du kende melodien (literally Do you recognize the melody) featuring some of his most famous and recognized film and TV scores.

In 2018, Bent Fabricius-Bjerre was honored for his long and active career by naming a new species of beetle †Cacomorphocerus bentifabrici (Fabrizio Fanti & Anders Leth Damgaard, 2018). Married thrice, he died on 28 July 2020.

Film music
 Poeten og Lillemor (1958)
 Helle for Helene (1959)
 Forelsket i København (1960)
 Poeten og Lillemor og Lotte (1960)
 Cirkus Buster (1961)
 Flemming på kostskole (1961)
 Svinedrengen og prinsessen på ærten (1962)
 Poeten og Lillemor i forårshumør (1963)
 Tre piger i Paris (1963)
 Hvis lille pige er du? (1963)
  (1964)
 Døden kommer til middag (1964)
 Pigen og millionæren (1965)
 Strike First Freddy (1965)
 Relax Freddy (1966)
 Olsen-banden (1968–1998)
 Olsenbanden (Norwegian, 1969–1999)
 Tænk på et tal (1969)
 Ballade på Christianshavn (1971)
 Flåklypa Grand Prix (Norwegian, 1975)
 Matador (TV series, 1978–1981)
 Min farmors hus (1984)
 Når engle elsker (1986)
 Peter von Scholten (1990)
 Lad isbjørnene danse (1990)
 Det skaldede spøgelse (1992)
 Blinkende lygter (2000)
 Olsen-banden Junior (2001)
 Klovn - The Movie (2010)

Discography

Albums
 1962 Alley Cat (Atco Records)
 1962 The Happy Puppy (Atco Records)
 1963 Piano Party with Bent Fabric (Columbia 33-OSX-7720)(Australia)
 1964 Organ Grinder's Swing (Atco Records)
 1964 The Drunken Penguin (Atco Records)
 1965 Together! (with Acker Bilk) (Atco Records)
 1966 Never Tease Tigers (Atco Records)
 1967 Operation Lovebirds (Atco Records)
 1968 Relax With Bent Fabric (Atco Records)
 1997 The Very Best of Bent Fabric
 1998 Klaver med mer (CMC Records)
 2001 Mit livs melodi (Copenhagen Records)
 2004 Jukebox (Universal)
 2005 Kan du kende melodien (Universal)
 2014 Bent Fabricius-Bjerre og Hans Musik (Warner Music)

Singles
 1962 "Alley Cat"
 1963 "Chicken Feed"
 1965 "Alley Cat Dance / Drunken Penguin" (#9 Canada)
 2003 "Jukebox"
 2003 "Shake"
 2006 "Sweet Senorita"

References

External links
Official website
 
 

1924 births
2020 deaths
Musicians from Copenhagen
Danish pianists
Male composers
Danish film score composers
Atco Records artists
People from Frederiksberg
Male pianists
21st-century pianists
Male film score composers
21st-century male musicians
Bodil Honorary Award recipients